Mandalay Technological University (MTU) (formerly, the Mandalay Institute of Technology - MIT), in Patheingyi, Mandalay, is a senior prestigious engineering university in Myanmar. The university offers undergraduate, and postgraduate programmes in engineering disciplines to students and is one of the most selective universities in the country, admitting approximately only 300-350 undergrad students annually based on their University Entrance Examination scores.

Since MTU offers master's, doctoral and other postgraduate diploma offering programmes, it takes around 200-300 postgrads every academic year.

History
The university was founded as Mandalay Institute of Technology (MIT) on October 1, 1991 and became the 2nd university of engineering and technology to be founded in Myanmar after Yangon Institute of Technology (now Yangon Technological University). In 2012, Mandalay Institute of Technology (MIT) was renamed Mandalay Technological University (MTU).

In March 2012, Centers of Excellence (COE) project, that selected the best technological universities in the country to upgrade and meet the international standard in engineering education, was initiated by the Ministry of Science and Technology. Mandalay Technological University (MTU) for the students who passed from the Upper Myanmar exam centers and Yangon Technological University (YTU) for the students who passed matriculation exam from Lower Myanmar exam centers were designated as COEs. Since then, Mandalay Technological University (MTU) has started to accept the best and most outstanding students around the country to undergraduate programs and they are called as Center of Excellence (COE) students. Only top 1.2% scorers in the annual University Entrance Examination are accepted to MTU, and thus MTU remains the best university which students need best scores among all the students around Myanmar to get acceptance.

University Presidents

Programmes
The university's main offerings are six-year bachelor's and two-year master's degree programmes. Two-thirds of nearly 7500 students who graduated between 1997 and 2004 received bachelor's degrees and 7.3% received master's.

Engineering

The following one-year postgraduate diploma, two-year master's and doctoral programmes were offered in applied sciences until 2010. Now these programmes are not available anymore.

Departments
The MTU is organized as follows:
 engineering departments,
 research departments,
 academic departments, and
 supporting departments.

Engineering departments
MTU's engineering departments are as follows:
 Department of Architecture
 Department of Biotechnology Engineering
 Department of Chemical Engineering
 Department of Petroleum Engineering
 Department of Civil Engineering
 Department of Electrical Power Engineering
 Department of Electronics Engineering
 Department of Energy Technology (NT)
 Department of Computer Engineering and Information Technology
 Department of Mechanical Engineering
 Department of Mechatronics Engineering
 Department of Metallurgy Engineering
 Department of Mining Engineering 
 Department of Remote Sensing

Academic departments
The academic departments are:
 Department of Burmese 
 Department of English
 Department of Engineering Chemistry
 Department of Engineering Mathematics
 Department of Engineering Physics
 Department of Engineering Geology 
 Department of Workshop Technology

Research departments
The research departments are:
 Chemical Research Centre and
 Electrical & Communication and Electrical Power Research

Supporting departments
Supporting departments are:
 Administration
 Estate Engineering
 Finance
 Human Resources 
 International Relations 
 Quality Management 
 Students' Affairs
 Workshop

Undergraduate diplomas
The university also offers one-year Diploma in Technology degrees in the following:
 Civil
 Electrical Power
 Electronics
 Mechanical

See also
 Yangon Technological University
 Pyay Technological University
 List of Technological Universities in Myanmar

References

Universities and colleges in Mandalay
Technological universities in Myanmar
Universities and colleges in Myanmar
Educational institutions established in 1991
1991 establishments in Myanmar